Patrick Lane may refer to:

Patrick Lane (poet) (1939–2019), Canadian poet
Patrick Lane (cyclist), (born 1991), Australian cyclist
Patrick Lane (politician) (born 1975), American politician

See also
Paddy Lane (footballer) (born 2001), football player for Fleetwood Town FC
Paddy Lane (politician) (1934–2012), Irish Fianna Fáil politician
Patrik Laine